Mayskaya Zarya is a rural locality in Mokovsky Selsoviet Rural Settlement, Kursky District, Kursk Oblast, Russia. Population:

Geography 
The village is located 82.5 km from the Russia–Ukraine border, 6 km south-west of Kursk, 1.5 km from the selsoviet center – 1st Mokva.

 Streets
There are the following streets in the locality: Otradnaya, Plyazhnaya, Prokhladnaya, Rassvetnaya, Rassvetny pereulok, Rodnikovaya, Tikhy pereulok, Vekovaya and Vysoky pereulok (85 houses).

 Climate
Mayskaya Zarya has a warm-summer humid continental climate (Dfb in the Köppen climate classification).

Transport 
Mayskaya Zarya is located 0.8 km from the federal route  Crimea Highway (a part of the European route ), on the road of intermunicipal significance  (M2 "Crimea Highway" – Dukhovets), 7.5 km from the nearest railway station Ryshkovo (railway line Lgov I — Kursk).

The rural locality is situated 16.5 km from Kursk Vostochny Airport, 122 km from Belgorod International Airport and 219 km from Voronezh Peter the Great Airport.

References

Notes

Sources

Rural localities in Kursky District, Kursk Oblast